Gje (or ) (Ѓ ѓ; italics: Ѓ ѓ) is a letter of the Cyrillic script.

Ѓ is used in Macedonian to represent the voiced palatal plosive .

Ѓ is most commonly romanised using the Latin letter G with acute . When the Socialist Republic of Macedonia was part of SFR Yugoslavia, the Macedonian  was also transliterated as đ, ģ, or dj.

Related letters and other similar characters
Ģ ģ: Latin letter G with cedilla - a Latvian letter
Г г: Cyrillic letter Ge
Ђ ђ: Cyrillic letter Dje
Ќ ќ: Cyrillic letter Kje
Ď ď

Computing codes

References

External links